Edwin Victor Baptie is a South African politician. A member of the Democratic Alliance, he has been a member of the KwaZulu-Natal Legislature since August 2022. He had previously as the leader of the DA caucus in the uMdoni Local Municipality.

Political career
Baptie was the ward councillor for ward 10 in the uMdoni Local Municipality. He was appointed chairperson of the Democratic Alliance's Ugu North Constituency in 2016. He served as the leader of the DA caucus from 2007 until his resignation from council to take up a seat in the KwaZulu-Natal Legislature in August 2022. 

On 30 August 2022, Baptie was sworn in as a member of the KwaZulu-Natal Legislature. He replaced former DA MPL Rishigen Viranna, who had resigned from the legislature after he was awarded a two-year scholarship to study Global Health in Sweden.

References

External links

Living people
Year of birth missing (living people)
Place of birth missing (living people)
South African people of Indian descent
Democratic Alliance (South Africa) politicians
Members of the KwaZulu-Natal Legislature